Talas District may refer to:
Talas District, Kazakhstan
Talas District, Kyrgyzstan